Moti Lal Dugar is a Nepali industrialist and a member of the House of Representatives of the Federal Parliament. In the 2017 election, he was elected to parliament from CPN UML under the proportional representation system filling the reserved seat for Madhesi group.

References

Living people
21st-century Nepalese people
Communist Party of Nepal (Unified Marxist–Leninist) politicians
Nepal Communist Party (NCP) politicians
Place of birth missing (living people)
21st-century industrialists
Madhesi people
Nepal MPs 2017–2022
Members of the 1st Nepalese Constituent Assembly
1960 births